Cape Chocolate is a small, dark cape forming the south side of Salmon Bay on the coast of Victoria Land. It is made up of morainic material from the west margin of the Koettlitz Glacier. It was discovered by the British National Antarctic Expedition, 1901–04, under Robert Falcon Scott, and probably so named because of the color of the morainic material.

References
 

Headlands of Victoria Land
Scott Coast